The Sydney Organising Committee for the Games of the XXVII Olympiad, or SOCOG, also known as the Sydney Organising Committee, was an informal name for the Sydney Organising Committee for the Games of the XXVII Olympiad. The President of SOCOG was Michael Knight.

References

2000 Summer Olympics
Organising Committees for the Olympic Games
Summer Olympics
Sport in Sydney